Antell may refer to:

People
Calum Antell (born 1992), Welsh footballer
Kasten Antell (1845–1906), Finnish politician

Other uses
Mount Antell, a mountain in South Georgia